Qaradağlı (also, Qara-dağlı, and Karadagly) is a village and municipality in the Goranboy Rayon of Azerbaijan.  It has a population of 2,928.

Notable natives 
 Elman Mukhtarov — 2010 Youth Olympic Games winner.

References 

Populated places in Goranboy District